Gabriel Kajcsa (born 7 July 1974) is a Romanian football coach and former player.

References
 

1974 births
Living people
Romanian footballers
FC Vaslui players
FC Brașov (1936) players
Association football goalkeepers